Thomas Twining may refer to:

Thomas Twining (merchant) (1675–1741), English merchant and founder of the Twinings tea company
Thomas Twining (scholar) (1735–1804), English scholar and classicist, grandson of the above

See also
Twining (surname)